Ch'alla Willk'i (Aymara ch'alla sand, willk'i gap, "sand gap", also spelled Challa Willkhi, Challo Willi) is a mountain in the Bolivian Andes, about  high. It is situated in the La Paz Department, Murillo Province, La Paz Municipality, east of the main range of the Cordillera Real. Ch'alla Willk'i lies between Kunturiri in the southwest and Llust'a in the northeast, and northwest of Turini. A little river named Ch'iyar Jawira ("black river", Chias Jahuira) originates near the mountain. It flows to the northeast.

References 

Mountains of La Paz Department (Bolivia)